Stephen Thomas may refer to:

Stephen Thomas of Bosnia (died 1461), King of Bosnia, 1443–1461
Stephen Thomas (Medal of Honor) (1809–1903), American Union Army officer and politician
Stephen Thomas (rugby) (1865–1937), Welsh rugby union player
Stephen Thomas (architect) (1892–1949), practiced mainly in Charleston, South Carolina
Stephen Thomas (DSC)(Royal Naval officer) (born 1961), Royal Navy Fleet Air Arm aviator
Stephen Thomas (economist), professor of economics at the University of Greenwich Business School
Stephen Thomas (sailor) (born 1977), Welsh Paralympic sailor

See also
Steven Thomas (disambiguation)
Steve Thomas (disambiguation)